The Ministry of Climate Change , wazarat-e- mosmyati tabdeeli (abbreviated as MoCC), is a Cabinet-level ministry of the Government of Pakistan concerned with climate change in Pakistan. Senator Sherry Rehman is in charge of the ministry with the status of a Federal Minister.

Wings 
The ministry has multiple wings under it, as described below.
Administrative Wing - a total of 173 employees work at the Ministry of Climate Change. This wing is head by a joint secretary. The Current Secretary-in-Charge is Mr. Hassan Nasir Jamy.
Climate Finance Unit, Pakistan - under the supervision of the current secretary-in-charge.
Development Wing - policy matters relating to development schemes. It monitors development projects, work/cash plans, and more.
Environment Wing - it is headed by the Director-General. It focuses on Environmental Legislation, trans-boundary (inter-provincial, regional and international) Issues. It also focuses on matters relating to Sustainable Development, Water & Sanitation, Sustainable Urbanization. It is also responsible for multilateral Environmental Agreements (MEAs) including UN Framework Convention on Climate Change (UNFCCC) and Kyoto Protocol.
Forestry Wing
International Cooperation Wing (IC Wing)

Attached departments (agencies)

 Global Change Impact Studies Centre 
 National Disaster Management Authority
 National Institute of Disaster Management
 Pakistan Environmental Protection Agency
 Zoological Survey Department

References

 

Federal government ministries of Pakistan
Politics of climate change
Climate change in Pakistan
Pakistan